"Serial Killers" is a song by American rapper Gucci Mane, released on April 15, 2022. It was produced by BandPlay.

Composition
Described as reminiscent of Gucci Mane's music in his early career, the song features "haunting" production. Lyrically, Mane criticizes rappers that pretend to have lived in the streets, while also detailing his own experiences of the lifestyle as proof of how he can tell if someone is lying about having lived it as well.

Music video
The music video was released alongside the single. Directed by Omar the Director, it shows Gucci Mane rapping in a plastic-covered room, and wearing a pair of hoodies that are emblazoned with messages, which call for the release of 1017 Records rappers Pooh Shiesty and Foogiano.

Charts

References

2022 singles
2022 songs
Gucci Mane songs
Songs written by Gucci Mane
Atlantic Records singles